Tobosi is a district of the El Guarco canton, in the Cartago province of Costa Rica. It is located about 3 miles southwest of the city of Cartago. It is also known as San Juan de Tobosi. St. John the Evangelist is the town's patron guardian.

History 
Tobosi is one of the oldest town in the country.  It was established as a reduction by the Spanish authorities and the Franciscan friars around 1575, with a population of one hundred people. Other interpretations suggest that the town started with a hundred families.

Until 1826, the population consisted exclusively of indigenous peoples (ethnic Huet), but due to its proximity to the city of Cartago, its inhabitants were frequently used as forced labor for the benefit of the Spanish population and rapidly lost their language, dress and customs.

In 1568, responding to protests against the common abuses resulting from the direct enslavement of indigenous people by conquistadors, the Spanish King, Phillip II, created laws to protect the Indians and decreed such parceling out of indigenous peoples as slaves to be illegal.  Instead of being owned directly by individual conquistadors, Indian villages or tribes were to pay a prescribed amount into a fund out of which an annual stipend was to be paid to each of the grantees.  Nonetheless, the conquistadors protested to their Governor against this new arrangement and in January 1569 the Governor, Pero Afán de Ribera y Gómez, illegally apportioned the indigenous peoples as slaves, including those of the villages surrounding Cartago, among approximately forty Spaniards.

During its period of Spanish domination, the town had its own town council or municipality, which was abolished in 1836 by the government of Braulio Carrillo Colina. Like other indigenous communities in the Central Valley of Costa Rica, the people also lost their communal lands, which were confiscated and sold at public auction.

Geography 
Tobosi has an area of  km² and an elevation of  metres.

Locations 
 Poblados (villages): Achiotillo, Barrancas, Bodocal, Garita, Purires, Tablón

Demographics 

For the 2011 census, Tobosi had a population of  inhabitants.

Transportation

Road transportation 
The district is covered by the following road routes:
 National Route 228

Economy 
The main economic activities are agriculture, livestock and some handicrafts baskets and rope.

References 

Districts of Cartago Province
Populated places in Cartago Province